The 2007 Asian Championship of Ski Mountaineering was the first edition of an Asian Championship of Ski Mountaineering

The event was organized by the Japan Mountaineering Association (JMA), and was officially sanctioned by the International Council for Ski Mountaineering Competitions (ISMC).

The championship was held at the Tsugaike Kōgen Ski Resort in the Japanese Nagano Prefecture from 31 March to 1 April 2007, and was the third ski mountaineering race event in the region. It had the official partnerships of Otari village authorities, Tsugaike Kōgen Ski Resort, Nagano mountaineering federation and other groups.

The participants, predominantly male racers, came from Japan, China, South Korea as well as from New Zealand.

Results 
Event was held on April 1, 2007. Offered were separate individual races for male and female racers. The race course for male competitors was set at a height of 1,500 meters to 2,000 meters with a distance of 12 kilometers and with a total vertical difference over the course of 1,295 meters for male ski mountaineers, and the course for the female participants covered a distance of 8.2 kilometres with a vertical distance of 985 metres.

The New Zealanders Grant Guise and Jane Harper won each race but did not appear in the Asian Championship's ranking, because they were not Asian country nationals.

List of the best ten participants by gender:

References 

2007
Asian Ski Mountaineering Championship
Asian Ski Mountaineering Championship
Asian Championship of Ski Mountaineering